The "LG-KS20" is a touch screen mobile phone manufactured by LG Electronics. 

Specification sheet

See also
Touchscreen
HTC Touch Diamond
iPhone
Samsung Omnia

References

External links
Official Website
LG KS20 CNET Asia Review
LG KS20 review

KS20
Mobile phones introduced in 2007